The Touchstone is a novella by American writer Edith Wharton. Written in 1900, it was the first of her many stories describing life in old New York.

Stephen Glennard, the novella's protagonist, is suddenly impoverished and unable to marry the woman he loves. He sells the private letters a former admirer had written to him, before she had become a famous author. He is later overcome by guilt for betraying one who had loved him.

Plot summary 
Stephen Glennard's career is falling apart and he desperately needs money so that he may marry his beautiful fiancee. He happens upon an advertisement in a London magazine promising the prospect of financial gain.

Glennard was once pursued by Margaret Aubyn, a famous and recently deceased author, and he still has her passionate love letters to him. Glennard removes his name from the letters and sells them, making him a fortune and establishing a marriage based on the betrayal of another.

However, his mounting shame and his guilty conscience ultimately force him to confess his betrayal to his wife. He fully expects (and even desires) that his confession will cause her to despise him. However, her wise and forgiving response opens a way for him to forgive himself and to make what limited amends he can make for his actions.

Analysis
The Touchstone is often dismissed as Wharton's early attempt at a sentimentalist work, which she would discard by the publication of The House of Mirth in 1905. Scholar Robin Peel, however, argues against this and notes that the book may be a satire of the genre due to its use of irony.

References

External links
 
 

 
 

1900 American novels
American novellas
Novels by Edith Wharton
1900 debut novels